Passports are issued to citizens of Eswatini to travel outside the country. In 2015, citizens had visa-free or visa on arrival access to 67 countries and territories, ranking the passport 73rd in the world, and 7th in Africa.

See also
 Visa requirements for Swazi citizens

References

External links
 Picture of Swaziland passport

Passports by country
Foreign relations of Eswatini